The 2009 National Lacrosse League season, the 23rd in the history of the NLL, began January 3, 2009 in Buffalo, Portland, and Sunrise, Florida, and concluded with the Calgary Roughnecks defeating the New York Titans 12—10 in the Champion's Cup on May 15, 2009 in Calgary, Alberta, Canada.

Team movement
After the 2008 season was cancelled and then reinstated, the Boston Blazers and Arizona Sting both announced that they would not participate in the 2008 season, and would return in 2009.  However, in the summer of 2008 the Arizona Sting ceased operations and its players were put in a dispersal draft. The Blazers drafted former Sting and LumberJax forward Dan Dawson first overall.

Just weeks prior to the start of the season, the Chicago Shamrox suspended operations due to financial troubles and the players were placed in another dispersal draft. Anthony Cosmo was selected 1st overall by the Boston Blazers in this draft.

Finally, while not a franchise relocation, the Minnesota Swarm were moved from the East Division to the West Division.

Final standings

Playoffs

Milestones and events

Pre-season
 August 19, 2008: The NLL announced that the Minnesota Swarm would be moving from the East division to the West division, giving the West six teams to the East's seven.
 August 22, 2008: Chicago Shamrox goalie Matt Roik was traded to the San Jose Stealth with two first round draft picks in exchange for veteran goalie Anthony Cosmo.
 September 2, 2008: The Rochester Knighthawks announce that Paul Suggate will be the new head coach. Freeman Bucktooth and former team captain Mike Hasen were also named assistant coaches.
 September 7, 2008: Just hours before the entry draft, the Toronto Rock, San Jose Stealth, and Rochester Knighthawks made a blockbuster trade. Toronto sent Aaron Wilson and a 2009 first round draft pick to Rochester, who sent Stephen Hoar back to Toronto. Toronto also received Luke Wiles from San Jose, while San Jose gets Rochester's first round pick in the 2008 entry draft.
 September 9, 2008: Rochester Knighthawks star John Grant, Jr. announced that he would miss the entire 2009 season after undergoing emergency surgery to remove an infection in the ACL in his left knee.
 September 25: The NLL announced that a regular season game will be played between the New York Titans and the Toronto Rock at BankAtlantic Center in Sunrise, Florida, a suburb of Fort Lauderdale. The game will be known as the Florida Lacrosse Cup. This will be the first pro lacrosse game ever played in the state. The event was spearheaded by former Rock and Philadelphia Wings forward Kevin Finneran.
 October 15, 2008: The Rochester Knighthawks acquired the rights to lacrosse legend Gary Gait from the Colorado Mammoth for forward Andrew Potter and first-round draft picks in both 2009 and 2010. Gait, whose single-season scoring record was shattered during the 2008 season by Athan Iannucci, originally retired from the NLL after the 2005 season.
 November 11, 2008: Legendary goaltender Dallas Eliuk announced that he will not play in 2009, taking a job as an assistant coach with the Portland LumberJax. Eliuk did not officially announce his retirement until December 9. Eliuk won four NLL championships, all with the Wings, and is the NLL's all-time leader in saves. 
 November 25, 2008: Rochester Knighthawks GM Regy Thorpe signed a playing contract, becoming the first player-GM in NLL history.
 December 24, 2008: Less than four months after taking the job and without a single regular season game under his belt, Paul Suggate resigned his position as Rochester head coach. No reason was given for Suggate's resignation. Only two days later, the Knighthawks announced that lacrosse legend Paul Gait had been hired as head coach.

Regular season
 January 3, 2009: The Toronto Rock won the first-ever Florida Lacrosse Cup, defeating the New York Titans 15-14 to open the season. Blaine Manning scored the winner, his fourth goal of the game, with 38 seconds left in regulation time to seal the victory, and was named Overall Player of the Week.
 January 10, 2009: Jim Jennings announced his resignation as commissioner of the NLL, stating: "I feel that I have accomplished all the goals I set out to do at the NLL. I want to spend some time with my family before pursuing other opportunities and taking on the next challenge." NLL Deputy Commissioner and COO George Daniel was named Interim Commissioner.
 January 10, 2009: Gary Gait scored five goals in his return to the NLL, but Rochester lost to Philadelphia 16-13.
 January 16, 2009:  In a 23-6 loss at Buffalo, the Rochester Knighthawks allowed the most goals in a single game in their history. The 17-point defeat was also their most lopsided loss ever.
 January 20, 2009: Only three games into the season, the Toronto Rock fired head coach Glenn Clark and assistant coach Terry Bullen and hired former Chicago Shamrox and Colorado Mammoth coach Jamie Batley as the new head coach. Assistant coach Jim Veltman was relieved of his coaching duties, but remained with the Rock as an advisor.
 February 10, 2009: The league announced that Dallas Eliuk and Jim Veltman will be inducted into the National Lacrosse League Hall of Fame in March, 2009.
 February 14, 2009: Mark Steenhuis of the Buffalo Bandits scored 13 assists and 17 points in a 25-10 win over Toronto breaking the league's single-game records for assists and points. The records were previously held by Derek Malawsky (11 assists in 2002) and John Grant Jr. (15 points in 2007) both of the Rochester Knighthawks.
 March 20, 2009: The San Jose Stealth announced that offensive coordinator Chris Hall has been named head coach, while former head coach Jeff Dowling will take over Hall's post as offensive coordinator.
 April 11, 2009: San Jose Stealth rookie Rhys Duch scored five goals and added three assists, giving him 86 points for the season, breaking Gavin Prout's rookie scoring record. In the same game, Stealth captain Colin Doyle tied Josh Sanderson's single-season assists record of 71.
 April 17, 2009: Calgary's Josh Sanderson finished the season with 74 assists, breaking his own single-season record of 71. The next night, Boston's Dan Dawson had five assists, tying him with Sanderson for the league lead and record.
 April 18, 2009: Rhys Duch extends his new rookie scoring record to 89, with one goal and two assists against the Toronto Rock.

Post-season
 April 22, 2009: After missing the playoffs for the sixth time in seven years, the Philadelphia Wings fired GM Lindsay Sanderson. The Wings were 38-42 during Sanderson's five-year tenure, and only made the playoffs once.
 April 29, 2009: Toronto Rock Director of Lacrosse Operations Mike Kloepfer announced his resignation. The Rock were 19-29 in three years under Kloepfer, missing the playoffs in both 2008 and 2009.
 May 4, 2009: The Portland LumberJax announced that they will not be playing in Portland next season. Executive vice president Brian Silcott said that the team will not fold, but they are looking at either moving or selling the franchise; the franchise did fold, however.
 May 9, 2009: Both division final games featured outstanding performances by the winning goaltenders. In New York, Matt Vinc stopped 41 out of 44 shots and kept the Buffalo Bandits to only three goals as the Titans defeated Buffalo 9-3. In Calgary, Matt King shut the San Jose Stealth out for the first three quarters and even scored a goal of his own - the game-winner - as Calgary destroyed the Stealth 17-5.
 May 15, 2009: The Calgary Roughnecks defeated the New York Titans 12-10 to capture their second Champions Cup title.
 May 19, 2009: The Edmonton Rush fired head coach and GM Bob Hamley after finishing last in the West for the second straight season.

All-Star game
The 2009 All-Star Game was held at Pepsi Center in Denver on March 7, 2009. The East beat the West 27-21 as Buffalo's Mark Steenhuis scored seven goals and six assists on his way to his third All-Star Game MVP award.

All-Star teams

* Unable to play due to injury

Awards

Annual

All-Pro teams
First Team
 Dan Dawson, Boston
 Colin Doyle, San Jose
 Casey Powell, New York
 Brodie Merrill, Portland
 Billy Dee Smith, Buffalo
 Ken Montour, Buffalo

Second Team
 Josh Sanderson, Calgary
 John Tavares, Buffalo
 Jordan Hall, New York
 Mark Steenhuis, Buffalo
 Mac Allen, Rochester
 Anthony Cosmo, Boston

All-Rookie team
 Rhys Duch, San Jose
 Daryl Veltman, Boston
 Kevin Buchanan, Minnesota
 Stephen Peyser, New York
 Jon Harnett, Boston
 Tyler Richards, San Jose

Weekly awards
The NLL gives out awards weekly for the best overall player, best offensive player, best transition player, best defensive player, and best rookie.

Monthly awards 
Awards are also given out monthly for the best overall player and best rookie.

Statistics leaders
Bold numbers indicate new single-season records. Italics indicate tied single-season records.

See also
 2009 in sports

References

External links
 2009 schedule

09
National Lacrosse League